Rynox is a 1932 British crime film directed by Michael Powell and starring Stewart Rome, John Longden and Dorothy Boyd.  Rynox was adapted from a 1930 novel by popular thriller writer of the day Philip MacDonald. It was made at Walton Studios outside London and was a second feature.

For many years Rynox was believed to be among the lost films of Powell's 1931–1936 quota quickie period; however an original print was found in 1990 in the vaults of Pinewood Studios and was subsequently transferred and restored by the BFI National Archive.

Plot summary
Wealthy businessman F.X. Benedik (Rome), head of the Rynox company, claims to have been receiving threats from a mysterious stranger named Boswell Marsh. Benedik is subsequently found murdered and the hunt is on for the elusive Marsh.

Benedik's son Tony (Longden) takes over the running of the business and tries to find some lead on Marsh, and why he should have borne a murderous grudge against Benedik Senior. His investigations lead him to the unexpected finding that Marsh never existed.

After discovering that he was terminally ill, his father had committed suicide, having staged the elaborate deception about the non-existent Marsh in an attempt to cover the fact that he intended to take his own life.

Cast
 Stewart Rome as Boswell Marsh/F.X. Benedik
 John Longden as Tony Benedik
 Dorothy Boyd as Peter
 Charles Paton as Samuel Richworth
 Leslie Mitchell as Woolrich
 Edward Willard as Capt. James
 Fletcher Lightfoot as Prout
 Sybil Grove as Secretary

Reception
Although shot on a tight budget (Powell's own recollections varied between £4,500 and £8,000) Rynox was exceptionally well received by contemporary critics.  Writing in The Observer, noted critic C. A. Lejeune presciently remarked: "Powell's Rynox shows what a good movie brain can do... this is the sort of pressure under which a real talent is shot red-hot into the world."  Documentary film pioneer John Grierson declared the film "as good as Hollywood" and that "there never was an English film so well-made".  A 21st-century assessment by Sergio Angelini of the British Film Institute states: "Powell's direction already shows his characteristic energy and visual imagination, as well as his debt to the German Expressionist cinema of the 1920s. Rynox is full of quick cuts, tracking shots, unusual angles as well as montages, all of which help effectively to draw attention away from ...the film's small budget."

See also
 List of rediscovered films

References

External links 
 
 
 

1932 films
1932 crime films
British crime films
Films directed by Michael Powell
Films by Powell and Pressburger
British black-and-white films
1930s English-language films
Films based on British novels
1930s rediscovered films
Films set in London
Rediscovered British films
1930s British films
Quota quickies
Films shot at Nettlefold Studios
Ideal Film Company films